IMI International Management Institute, Switzerland is a private hospitality school offering programmes from foundation level to Master of Science. It offers students the opportunity to undertake paid, practical internships as part of their programme either in Switzerland or internationally. It is one of Switzerland's smaller private hotel schools (with a maximum of 200 students per semester) and aims to offer students a highly personalised educational experience. The school has over 25 years of offering Swiss hospitality education and was named in the top 20 providers of hospitality management education in the 2019 QS rankings.

Programs
 BA (Hons) Degree in International Hotel, Tourism and Events Management
 BA (Hons) Degree in International Culinary Arts
 BA (Hons) Degree in Global Business or Marketing Management
 MSc in International Hospitality and Events Management
 Postgraduate Diploma in International Hotel and Events Management
 Postgraduate Diploma in International Culinary Arts

History
In August 1991 the International Management Institute was founded at the Hotel Waldstaetten in Weggis with 55 students. By 1995 180 students per semester were being taught at IMI. In 1997 the current campus was launched in Kastanienbaum 12 bus minutes away from Lucerne. Today, around 200 students are studying each academic semester at IMI.

Campuses

IMI Campus
IMI Kastanienbaum campus is overlooked by Pilatus (mountain) and is situated on the banks of  Lake Lucerne.

References

External links 
 

Educational institutions established in 1991
Hospitality schools in Switzerland
Organisations based in Lucerne
Business schools in Switzerland
Education in Lucerne
1991 establishments in Switzerland